Richard Adelbert Lipsius (14 February 1830 in Gera, Thuringia – 19 August 1892 in Jena, Thuringia) was a German Protestant theologian.

Biography
Richard Adelbert Lipsius was the son of K. H. A. Lipsius (d. 1861), who was rector of the  school of St. Thomas at Leipzig, was born at Gera on 14 February 1830. He studied at Leipzig, and eventually (1871) settled at Jena as professor ordinaries. He helped to found the "Evangelical Protestant Missionary Union" and the "Evangelical Alliance", and from 1874 took an active part in their management. He died at Jena on 19 August 1892.

Works
Lipsius wrote principally on dogmatics and the history of early Christianity from a liberal and critical standpoint. A Neo-Kantian, he was to some extent an opponent of Albrecht Ritschl, demanding

This, in part, is Lipsius's attitude in Philosophie und Religion (1885). In his Lehrbuch der evangelisch-protestantischen Dogmatik (1876; 3rd ed., 1893) he deals in detail with the doctrines of "God", "Christ", "Justification" and the "Church".
Herausgeber:

From 1875 Lipsius assisted Karl August von Hase (1800-1890), Otto Pfleiderer (1839-1908) and Eberhard Schrader (1836-1908) in editing Jahrbücher für protestantische Theologie, and from 1885 until 1891 he edited the Theologische Jahresbericht.

His other works include:
Die Pilatusakten (1871, new ed., 1886)
Dogmatische Beiträge (1878)
Die Quellen der ältesten Ketzergeschichte (1875)
 Zur Quellenkritik des Epiphanios. Wien, Braumueller, (1865)
Die apokryphen Apostelgeschichten (1883-1890)
Hauptpunkte der christl. Glaubenslehre im Umriss dargestellt (1889)
 and commentaries on the Epistles to the Galatians, Romans and Philippians in H.J. Holtzmann's Handkommentar zum Neuen Testament (1891-1892)

Notes

References

Further reading

External links
 

1830 births
1892 deaths
People from Gera
19th-century German Protestant theologians
German biblical scholars
New Testament scholars
19th-century German male writers
19th-century German writers
German male non-fiction writers